Grzegorz Antoni Ogiński (23 June 1654–17 October 1709) was a Polish-Lithuanian Hetman and governor-general of the Duchy of Samogitia from 1698. He was the fourth and youngest son of Jan Jacek Ogiński, also a hetman.

Ogiński was one of the leaders of the uprising against the Sapieha Lithuanian magnates. He was successful in the Lithuanian Civil War which culminated in the Battle of Valkininkai on 18 November 1700. After the battle, Michał Franciszek Sapieha the main leader of the Sapieha faction, as well as many other members of the family and its supporters, were murdered by a drunken mob of szlachta.

Ogiński was a supporter and close associate of King Augustus II the Strong. He was made the Field Hetman of Lithuania on 20 November 1703 and in 1709 the Great Hetman of Lithuania. He was made Knight of the Order of the White Eagle in 1705.

His father was Jan Jacek Ogiński  (died 1684), also a Hetman. He was married to Teofila Czartoryska and had a son, Kazimierz Marcjan Ogiński (died 1727) and a daughter Elżbieta Magdalena Ogińska. He died in Lublin in 1709.

References

1654 births
Place of birth missing
1709 deaths
Lithuanian politicians
Samogitian people
Grzegorz
Polish people of the Great Northern War
Field Hetmans of the Grand Duchy of Lithuania
Great Hetmans of the Grand Duchy of Lithuania
Elders of Samogitia
Recipients of the Order of the White Eagle (Poland)